The Warren Wanderers were a minor league baseball team based in Warren, Minnesota. In 1917, the Wanderers played as members of the Class C level Northern League.

History
Warren, Minnesota first hosted minor league baseball in 1917. The Warren Wanderers became members of the four–team Class C level Northern League. The Fargo-Moorhead Graingrowers, Minot Why Nots and Winnipeg Maroons joined Warren in league play.

Playing as a four–team league in 1917, the Northern League had decreased from playing as a six–team league in 1916 and an eight–team league in 1915.The start of World War II was a factor. Warren and Minot were new franchises in the league.

After beginning play on May 10, 1917, the Warren Wanderers finished last in the Northern League standings. The Northern League folded on July 4, 1917, due to World War II. With a record of 16–30, the team finished in 4th place, playing under manager Frank Withrow. Warren finished 16.0 games behind the 1st place Fargo-Moorhead Graingrowers in the final standings. The Fargo-Moorhead Graingrowers (36–16), Winnipeg Maroons (24–26) and Minot Why Nots (19–23) finished ahead of Warren in the final standings.

Warren, Minnesota has not hosted another minor league team.

The ballpark
The name of the home ballpark for the Warren Wanderers is unknown.

Year-by-Year Record

Notable alumni

Frank Withrow (1917, MGR)

References

External links
Baseball Reference

Northern League (1902-71) baseball teams
Defunct minor league baseball teams
Baseball teams established in 1917
Baseball teams disestablished in 1917
Defunct baseball teams in Minnesota
Marshall County, Minnesota